Andrew Scarborough (born 30 November 1973) is an English actor, most widely known for his starring role on screen as Tim Drewe in the multi BAFTA and Emmy award-winning Downton Abbey. He also co-starred as Colonel Fielding in the film ‘’The War Below’’ and as Graham Foster in the television drama series Emmerdale. He is also known for his roles on screen in Hearts and Bones, The Bible, Hidden and Bad Girls. He is also a theatre actor, performing in many of London's major theatres, including the West End theatre, and in many provincial theatres in the UK; he has toured on the European continent with the Actors Touring Company and performed at the Renaissance-Theater Berlin in Mark Ravenhill's Handbag.

Personal life 
Scarborough was born in Harrogate, West Riding of Yorkshire and attended Harrogate Grammar School.

Away from acting, Scarborough enjoys cycling.

Career 
Scarborough trained at the Webber Douglas Academy of Dramatic Art and  made his  professional debut on stage at the Harrogate Theatre in three plays, beginning with The Government Inspector as Dobchinsky, then A Midsummer Night's Dream as Oberon, and lastly as the Genie of the Lamp in the British 'panto' version of Aladdin. He then went on to play Heathcliff in Emily Brontë's  Wuthering Heights and from there played Renaldo in the 1995  London Almeida theatre production of Hamlet starring Ralph Fiennes.

Andrew made his television debut on the BBC's popular medical drama Casualty. He then went on to play roles in many TV dramas, including The Bill (ITV), Streets of Gold (S4C), Heartbeat (ITV), Touching Evil (ITV) and Silent Witness (BBC1). He also made a guest appearance in one of Britain's most highly regarded and favourite soaps Coronation Street as "love rat" Harvey Reuben.

His film debut was in a Hallmark production of Jason and the Argonauts.

He then went on to starring roles as Kevin Spiers in ITV's Bad Girls, Stewart Diamond in Channel 5's Suburban Shootout, Mark in The Innocent (a film for ITV), Michael Owen in the BBC comedy drama Hearts and Bones, which earned him rave reviews, Joshua in The Bible (History Channel), Magistrate Bassat in Jamaica Inn (BBC1) and Tim Drewe in Downton Abbey (ITV), which earned him more rave reviews. and he recently starred as Colonel Fielding in ‘’The War Below’’

Filmography

Theatre

References

External links 

 http://www.yaketyyak.co.uk/artists/andrew-scarborough
 https://web.archive.org/web/20160301172402/http://www.cam.co.uk/cv/client_andrew-scarborough_id_100325.htm

Living people
Alumni of the Webber Douglas Academy of Dramatic Art
20th-century English male actors
21st-century English male actors
English male film actors
English male stage actors
English male television actors
English male voice actors
Male actors from Yorkshire
Male actors from London
English male Shakespearean actors
Actors from Harrogate
1973 births
People educated at Harrogate Grammar School